General elections were held in Belgium on 10 March 1974. The Belgian Socialist Party emerged as the largest faction in the Chamber of Representatives with 59 of the 212 seats. Voter turnout was 90.3%. Elections were also held for the nine provincial councils, as well as for the Council of the German Cultural Community for the first time.

Results

Chamber of Representatives

Senate

Council of the German Cultural Community
In this election, the new Council of the German Cultural Community (Rat der deutschen Kulturgemeinschaft) was directly elected for the first time; members of the council had been appointed a year earlier. The council is the precursor to the Parliament of the German-speaking Community.

References

1974 elections in Belgium
March 1974 events in Europe